Days of Destruction, Days of Revolt is a 2012 illustrated non-fiction book authored by Chris Hedges and illustrated by Joe Sacco, chronicling life in poverty in different parts of the United States.

Structure
The book captures daily life in four areas of 'destruction or revolt', in five sections corresponding with five different locations:

 Days of Theft - Pine Ridge, South Dakota
 Days of Siege - Camden, New Jersey
 Days of Devastation - Welch, West Virginia
 Days of Slavery - Immokalee, Florida
 Days of Revolt - Liberty Square, New York City

The book is interspersed with interviews with several individuals as well as monographs capturing the devastation caused to people and the environment by unchecked post-industrial free market capitalism in the United States, in so called sacrifice zones.

Reception 
A review in The New York Times by Philipp Meyer was generally positive, and especially praised Sacco's illustrations and storytelling. Meyer was more critical of Hedges' contributions, describing his writings as "brilliant at depicting human life at the extremes of existence" but similar in tone to a "high priest." Both Meyer and a separate review by anarchist writer Kristian Williams negatively received the final chapter, which covered the Occupy movement. Williams' review was otherwise positive.

Days of Destruction, Days of Revolt received positive reviews in NJ.com and Library Journal.

References 

2012 non-fiction books
Books about poverty
Books critical of capitalism
Books by Chris Hedges
Nation Books books